Ali Arsalan (born 8 May 1995) is an Iranian-born naturalized Serbian Greco-Roman wrestler. He won the gold medal in the 72 kg event at the 2022 World Wrestling Championships held in Belgrade, Serbia. He represented Iran until December 2021.

He won one of the bronze medals in the 72 kg event at the 2022 European Wrestling Championships held in Budapest, Hungary.

Career 

He won one of the bronze medals in the men's 66 kg event at the 2015 World Junior Wrestling Championships held in Salvador da Bahia, Brazil. He also won one of the bronze medals in the men's 66 kg event at the 2017 Asian Wrestling Championships held in New Delhi, India.

He won the gold medal in the men's 72 kg at the 2021 Dan Kolov & Nikola Petrov Tournament held in Plovdiv, Bulgaria and the 2022 Dan Kolov & Nikola Petrov Tournament held in Veliko Tarnovo, Bulgaria.

Achievements

References

External links 
   

 

Living people
1995 births
People from Amol
Serbian male sport wrestlers
Asian Wrestling Championships medalists
European Wrestling Championships medalists
World Wrestling Championships medalists
Naturalized citizens of Serbia
20th-century Iranian people
21st-century Iranian people
21st-century Serbian people
World Wrestling Champions